The 1999–2000 NBA season was the Wizards' 39th season in the National Basketball Association. In the 1999 NBA draft, the Wizards selected Richard Hamilton from the University of Connecticut with the seventh pick. During the off-season, the team acquired Isaac Austin from the Orlando Magic, signed free agents Aaron Williams and Michael Smith, and hired Gar Heard as their new head coach. The biggest news would involve the front office as retired All-Star guard, and former Chicago Bulls legend Michael Jordan joined the Wizards as the team's vice president in January. After winning their first game of the season, the Wizards continued to under achieve posting a 7-game losing streak. With a 14–30 record at midseason, Heard was fired as head coach, and was replaced with Darrell Walker, and the team signed free agent Don Reid, who was previously released by the Detroit Pistons. Despite posting a solid 10–7 record in March, the Wizards finished last place in the Atlantic Division with a 29–53 record.

Mitch Richmond led the team with 17.4 points and 1.5 steals per game, while Juwan Howard averaged 14.9 points and 5.7 rebounds per game, and Rod Strickland provided the team with 12.6 points, 7.5 assists and 1.4 steals per game. Off the bench, sixth man Tracy Murray contributed 10.2 points per game, while Hamilton contributed 9.0 points per game, and Chris Whitney provided with 7.8 points and 3.8 assists per game. On the defensive side, second-year center Jahidi White averaged 7.1 points and 6.9 rebounds per game, while Williams provided with 7.6 points and 5.0 rebounds per game off the bench, and Smith led the team with 7.2 rebounds per game, but only played just 46 games due to an elbow injury.

Following the season, Austin was traded to the Vancouver Grizzlies, while Murray was traded to the Denver Nuggets, Williams signed as a free agent with the New Jersey Nets, Reid signed with the Orlando Magic, and Walker was fired as head coach.

Offseason

Draft picks

Roster

Regular season

Season standings

z - clinched division title
y - clinched division title
x - clinched playoff spot

Record vs. opponents

Game log

Player statistics

NOTE: Please write the players statistics in alphabetical order by last name.

Awards and records

Transactions

References

Washington Wizards seasons
Washington
Washington Wizards
Washington Wizards